In the Clutches of the Gang (also known as In the Clutches of a Gang) is a 1914 American short comedy film featuring Roscoe Arbuckle. The majority of the film is believed to be lost. However, a fragment of the film exists and is held by the Academy of Motion Picture Arts and Sciences.

Cast
 Roscoe 'Fatty' Arbuckle as Keystone Cop
 Robert Cox as Keystone Cop
 Bobby Dunn as Keystone Cop 
 George Jeske as Keystone Cop
 Edgar Kennedy as Keystone Cop
 Virginia Kirtley as The Girl
 Hank Mann as Keystone Cop
 Rube Miller as Keystone Cop
 George Nichols as The Detective
 Ford Sterling as Chief Tehiezel
 Al St. John as Keystone Cop

See also
 List of American films of 1914
 Fatty Arbuckle filmography

References

External links

1914 films
1914 comedy films
1914 short films
American silent short films
American black-and-white films
Lost American films
Silent American comedy films
American comedy short films
1914 lost films
Lost comedy films
Films directed by George Nichols
Films directed by Mack Sennett
1910s American films